75% Less Fat is the second album by Chris Mars. The title refers to the rejection of his former bandmates in The Replacements.

Production
Though Mars performs primarily as a one-man band, as he did on his previous album Horseshoes and Hand Grenades, his work also contains J.D. Foster on bass and clarinet.

Critical reception
AllMusic wrote: "Unlike most one-man projects, 75% Less Fat actually rocks -- there's a loose, unhinged feeling to the rhythms that make the music sound like a group effort." Entertainment Weekly called the music "beer-commercial-like riffs and bouncy, generic rhythms that, at best, sound like cheap imitations of [Mars's] own musical past." Trouser Press wrote that the album "may not push the envelope, but it cements an image of Mars as a serious musician with his own vision." Phoenix New Times called it "a well-played, well-produced recording that in the end fails to make any lasting impression."

Track listing
"Stuck in Rewind" (4:00)
"No Bands" (2:54)
"Weasel" (2:56)
"Public Opinion" (2:22)
"All Figured Out" (3:41)
"Whining Horse" (3:02)
"Car Camping" (3:00)
"Skipping School" (3:06)
"Bullshit Detector" (2:39)
"Candy Liquor" (3:04)
"Demolition" (3:32)
"No More Mud" (2:51)
"Nightcap" (3:06)

References

1993 albums
Chris Mars albums